WPDX may refer to:

 WPDX-FM, a radio station (104.9 FM) licensed to serve Clarksburg, West Virginia, United States
 WPDX (AM), a defunct radio station (750 AM) formerly licensed to serve Clarksburg, West Virginia